WATW (1400 AM) is a radio station  broadcasting a classic country music format under the branding "Bay Country 101.3," formerly broadcasting a conservative news and talk radio show under the branding "Freedom Talk 1400." Licensed to Ashland, Wisconsin, United States, the station is currently owned by Heartland Communications Group, LLC. It serves Ashland and Bayfield counties.

Its studios and transmitter are housed at 2320 Ellis Avenue in Ashland, with its local sister stations.

References

External links
WATW Radio

ATW
Radio stations established in 1940
1940 establishments in Wisconsin